Jacques Esclassan (born 3 September 1948) is a French former road bicycle racer who won the green jersey in the 1977 Tour de France. He also won five stages in Tour de France and a stage in Vuelta a España.

Major results

1972
Paris - Troyes
1973
Rodez
Vuelta a España:
Winner stage 9B
1974
Alès
Étoile de Bessèges
Périgueux
1975
Bain-de-Bretagne
Critérium International
Méréville
Quilan
Ronde d'Aix-en-Provence
Castres
Saclas-Mereville
Tour de France:
Winner stage 4
1976
Dunières
Ronde de Seignelay
Ambarès
Tour de France:
Winner stage 8
1977
Bagneux
Ile-sur-Tet
Castres
Tour de France:
 Winner points classification
Winner stage 5A
1978
Auzances
La Palmyre
Oradour-sur-Glane
Quilan
Ronde d'Aix-en-Provence
Saint-Claud
Tour de France:
Winner stages 2 and 12B
GP de Peymeinade
1979
GP Monaco

External links

1948 births
Living people
People from Castres
French male cyclists
French Tour de France stage winners
French Vuelta a España stage winners
Sportspeople from Tarn (department)
Cyclists from Occitania (administrative region)